is a former Japanese football player He is the current assistant managers of Vegalta Sendai.

Playing career
Murakami was born in Yokkaichi on January 20, 1981. After graduating from high school, he joined J1 League club Yokohama F. Marinos in 1999. Although he debuted and played several matches in 1999 J.League Cup, he could hardly play in the match. In 2001, he moved to J2 League club Vegalta Sendai. Although he could hardly play in the match in 2001 season, the club was promoted to J1 from 2002. From 2002, although he got opportunity to play as substitute midfielder, the club was relegated to J2 from 2004. From 2004, he played many matches as left side midfielder. From late 2005, he became a regular player as left side back. In 2007, he moved to J1 club Kawasaki Frontale. In 2007, he became a regular player as left side midfielder. Although his opportunity to play decreased behind Satoru Yamagishi in 2008, he became a regular player as left side back in 2009. The club won the 2nd place for 2 years in a row (2008-2009). The club also won the 2nd place 2007 and 2009 Emperor's Cup. In 2010, he moved to Omiya Ardija. He played many matches as right and left side back. However his opportunity to play decreased from 2012. In July 2014, he moved to Vegalta Sendai for the first time in 7 years. He retired end of 2015 season.

Club statistics

References

External links

1981 births
Living people
Association football people from Mie Prefecture
Japanese footballers
J1 League players
J2 League players
Yokohama F. Marinos players
Vegalta Sendai players
Kawasaki Frontale players
Omiya Ardija players
Association football defenders